"Under Any Moon" is a single by Glenn Medeiros and The Jets, released in 1989. 

Written by Diane Warren, the song was released as a single only in the United Kingdom. It was included on the soundtrack for The Karate Kid Part III (1989), on the Mercury label, and was also included on The Jets' album, Believe (1989), on the MCA label. 

The song failed to have any chart impact in the UK, while it did have minor airplay in the United States, it did not chart either. It was never performed live by The Jets.

References

1989 singles
1989 songs
The Jets (band) songs
Glenn Medeiros songs
Mercury Records singles
Songs written by Diane Warren